Way to Go is a British television sitcom, created by American television writer and producer Bob Kushell, about three men who start an assisted suicide business. The series premiered on BBC Three on 17 January 2013. Six 30-minute episodes were made. In July 2013, BBC Three announced that Way to Go had been cancelled after one series.

Regular cast and characters 
 Blake Harrison as Scott
Scott is a receptionist at a veterinary clinic who dropped out of medical school when he couldn't afford to pay for it. As the moral centre of the show, Scott constantly struggles with the implications of the business of death, and how it opens up life opportunities for him and his friends.

 Ben Heathcote as Joey
Scott's womanizing, wise-cracking half-brother with a gambling addiction.

 Marc Wootton as Cozzo
Scott's waggish pal who works as a fast-food machine repair technician.

 Laura Aikman as Julia
The daughter of Paddy, the first client of the assisted suicide business. She ends up becoming Scott's girlfriend.

 Sinead Matthews as Debbie
Cozzo's extraordinarily tolerant, newly-pregnant wife, who also happens to be a police officer.

 Hannah Job as Lucie
Scott's attractive, but somewhat vapid, ex-girlfriend who has high expectations and "great arms."

 Melanie Jessop as Dr. Jill
Scott's Machiavellian, sexually-harassing boss. She is the veterinarian at the pet clinic.

Episodes

Music 
The show's theme tune, "Superstar Luck Machine" was composed by Ian Masterson.

Controversy 
A week and a half before the show began airing, Conservative Tory MP Mark Pritchard publicly criticized the BBC for commissioning the programmed and turning the subject of assisted dying into "a matter of fun".

References

External links 

2010s British sitcoms
2013 British television series debuts
2013 British television series endings
BBC high definition shows
BBC television sitcoms
British comedy television shows
2010s British teen sitcoms
English-language television shows